Dara J. Norman is an astronomer and the Deputy Director of the Community Science and Data Center at the National Science Foundation's National Optical-Infrared Astronomy Research Laboratory (NOIRLab) in Tucson, Arizona. She is also the Association of Universities for Research in Astronomy Diversity Advocate at NOAO. Her research centers on the influence of Active Galactic Nuclei (AGN) on the evolution of galaxies. In 2020, she was inducted into the inaugural cohort of American Astronomical Society Fellows in recognition of her leadership and achievements.

Education and early career 
Norman grew up on the south side of Chicago, Illinois where she developed a love of astronomy, influenced by her mother, who was a fan of science fiction and the United States Space program. As a child, she wanted to grow up to be an astronomer before attending Massachusetts Institute of Technology. There, she studied under the mentorship of James Elliott, who was known for his leadership of the team that discovered Uranus's rings. She received her Bachelor of Science degree in 1988 in Earth, Atmospheric and Planetary Science.

After completing her undergraduate studies, Norman worked at NASA's Goddard Space Flight Center for three years. While presenting her research at the 1992 American Astronomical Society meeting, she met Bruce Margon, the chairman of the University of Washington's Astronomy department where she had recently applied to attend graduate school. The two had recently observed the same active galaxy using the Hubble Space Telescope, which they discussed during Norman's poster presentation. Norman was ultimately admitted to the University's graduate program and began in the Fall of 1992.Norman received her Doctorate degree in 1999, becoming the first African American woman to earn her Ph.D. in astronomy at the university. During her doctoral work, she specialized in gravitational lensing studied quasars. Following her doctoral work, Norman worked as a post-doctoral researcher at Stony Brook University. Subsequently, she became a National Science Foundation Astronomy and Astrophysics Postdoctoral Fellow, working at the National Optical Astronomy Observatory (NOAO) with the Deep Lens Survey team. In that role, she worked to understand how observed galaxies are magnified by gravitational lensing and how this so-called "magnification bias" affects our view of the universe.

Career

Research 
Norman is now an associate scientist and the Deputy Director of the Community Science and Data Center (CSDC) at the National Optical-Infrared Astronomy Research Laboratory  (NOIRLab), which operates NOAO as of October 1, 2019. Her research interests have evolved to focus on Active Galactic Nuclei (AGN), which are compact regions at the center of galaxies that are thought to be powered by supermassive black holes. AGN, which can be more luminous than an entire galaxy of stars, form as stars and gases are accreted through the activity of a supermassive black hole. Norman's research seeks to understand how these active galaxies form and why some of them are brighter than others.

Diversity, equity, and inclusion work 
Norman is recognized as a leader in diversity, equity, and inclusion, serving as the Association of Universities for Research in Astronomy Diversity Advocate at NOAO. In this role, she works on establishing and implementing recruitment and retention initiatives for minorities and women in astronomy. She also serves as a member of the American Astronomical Society's Committee on the Status of Minorities in Astronomy. She has served as an expert panelist in a number of National Academy of Sciences studies, which have culminated in the Academies' 2013 report on advancing women of color in academia and a 2018 report on sexual harassment in the sciences. Her advocacy efforts around inclusion focus on two areas of access: (1) access to sitting on advisory committees and leadership boards, ensuring that these groups are representative of the communities they seek to serve, and (2) access to large datasets, ensuring that the requisite training and infrastructure is available. In order to address the latter, she and her colleagues have advocated for making coding and development training widely available across the astronomy and astrophysics workforce, regardless of academic affiliation or career stage. She has noted that data access is becoming a prerequisite for telescope access, which is an essential component in advancing astronomers' research and careers.

Awards and honors 
 Distinguished Alumni Timeless Award, University of Washington, 2012
 Elected Legacy Fellow, American Astronomical Society, 2020
 Washington NASA Space Grant Fellowship

References 

Year of birth missing (living people)
Living people
Massachusetts Institute of Technology alumni
University of Washington alumni
African-American scientists
American astronomers
American women astronomers
American women scientists
Fellows of the American Astronomical Society
21st-century African-American people
21st-century African-American women